Resident Evil: Afterlife is a 2010 action horror film written and directed by Paul W. S. Anderson. It is the second film in the series that he directed, after the first film. A direct sequel to Resident Evil: Extinction (2007), it is the fourth installment in the Resident Evil film series, which is loosely based on the video game series of the same name, and the first to be shot in 3D. It stars Milla Jovovich, Ali Larter, Kim Coates, Shawn Roberts, Spencer Locke, Boris Kodjoe, and Wentworth Miller.

The film follows Alice searching for and rescuing the remaining survivors in Los Angeles after the T-virus outbreak, and teaming up against Albert Wesker, the head of the Umbrella Corporation. Chris Redfield, a primary character from the video games, was featured for the first time in the film franchise. Other characters from the games and films who returned are: Claire Redfield, Chris's sister who has lost her memory prior to the film's events; Albert Wesker, the film's main antagonist; and Jill Valentine, who made a cameo appearance.

In May 2005, producers mentioned the possibility of following Extinction with a sequel titled Afterlife. Extinction was released in 2007 and was a box office success, prompting Afterlife to begin development in June 2008, with the script being written by Anderson that December. Elements from the video game Resident Evil 5 (2009) were incorporated into the film including the mind control devices and Chris' confrontation with Wesker. Filming took place in Toronto from September to December 2009 using the 3D Fusion Camera System.

The film was released in 2D, 3D and IMAX 3D theaters on September 10, 2010, to generally mixed reviews. The film grossed $60 million in the United States and Canada on an estimated $60 million budget, and made $240 million in other markets surpassing the previous film's overseas total in the second week of release. Grossing a worldwide total of $300 million, Resident Evil: Afterlife became the second highest-grossing entry of the series. Resident Evil: Afterlife was released to DVD, Blu-ray, and Blu-ray 3D on December 28, 2010, in the United States. A fifth film, Resident Evil: Retribution, was released in 2012.

Plot
Alice and her clones lead the assault on Umbrella HQ, in Tokyo, slaying the entire branch except for Albert Wesker, who escapes in a tiltrotor plane and detonates a bomb that leaves a massive sinkhole. The real Alice boarded beforehand and attempts to execute Wesker, only for him to inject her with an anti-virus to remove her superhuman abilities. Wesker is revealed to have used the T-virus to gain his own superhuman abilities and prepares to kill Alice before the autopilot crashes the plane into the mountains.

Six months later, Alice travels to Alaska in an airplane, tracking broadcasts from a safe haven called Arcadia; she only finds abandoned planes and is attacked by a feral Claire Redfield. Alice destroys a spider-like device on Claire's chest, giving her amnesia and pacifying her. They travel to the ruins of Los Angeles, where they find survivors living in a prison surrounded by thousands of undead. They meet Luther West, who leads the surviving band from the prison, Wendell, Crystal Waters, Bennett, Kim Yong, and Angel Ortiz. With their help, Alice lands on the prison's roof and learns Arcadia isn't a fixed place, but a cargo tanker traveling along the coast. However, though the ship hasn't moved, no one from it has responded to the group's rescue flares. Luther takes Alice to the last inmate, Chris, who insists he's falsely imprisoned and will reveal an escape route in exchange for freedom. Alice goes to the showers to wash up but catches Wendell attempting to peep. Holding him at gunpoint, they are attacked by a group of infected people that dug into the prison. They take Wendell, but Alice wards off the rest.

Desperate, they free Chris, who reveals that Claire is his sister, and the prison has an armored car they can use to escape. However, a giant axe-wielding monster begins breaking down the gate. Alice, Chris, and Crystal go to the basement armory to get more guns, but zombies kill Crystal en route. Luther and Claire reinforce the gate. Angel informs Bennett and Yong the car is missing its engine, and it would take a week to fix. Bennett shoots Angel and heads for Arcadia in Alice's airplane. The Axeman breaks down the gate, allowing the zombies into the prison. The group decides to use the zombie-dug tunnels to escape into the sewers. Yong is slashed in half by the Axeman, while Alice is knocked out. Claire successfully defends Alice and disorients the Axeman, after which Alice kills it by firing at its head. Unfortunately, Luther is dragged into the tunnels by a zombie.

Alice and the Redfields board the Arcadia, discovering it functional but abandoned. Claire then remembers Arcadia is an Umbrella trap to get test subjects; they release the survivors, including K-Mart from Claire's group. Alice follows a trail of blood deeper into the ship, where she finds Wesker. The T-virus revived him, but it battles Wesker for control, something he believes fresh human DNA can pacify; the Umbrella staff fled when he began eating test subjects. Alice's DNA is superior to his since she retained control despite bonding with the virus at a cellular level. Wesker believes eating her will help him regain control of his body.

The Redfields fight Wesker while Alice battles Bennett, now working for Wesker. Wesker easily overpowers Chris and Claire, but Alice is able to defeat both Bennett and Wesker with help from K-Mart. They lock Bennett in the room to be devoured by Wesker when he revives. Wesker then escapes in an aircraft, activating a bomb on the Arcadia; the plane explodes instead as Alice placed the bomb there beforehand. Unbeknownst to them, Wesker parachutes away from the explosion, while Luther emerges from the sewers, battered but alive. Alice resolves to turn Arcadia into a real haven and broadcasts a new message for any other survivors. As Alice, Claire, and Chris watch over from Arcadia, it is approached by a squadron of Umbrella aircraft.

During a mid-credits scene in one of the aircraft, Jill Valentine, who went missing after the destruction of Raccoon City, is dictating the attack wearing the same mind control device used on Claire.

Cast

 Milla Jovovich as Alice and her clones; former Umbrella Corporation security officer turned rogue fighter, who has been captured by Umbrella scientist after escaping The Hive and being experimented upon. Since the T-virus outbreak at Raccoon City which has spread across the entire world, Alice has bonded with the virus on a cellular level, leaving her with powerful superhuman abilities, making her virtually indestructible.
 Ali Larter as Claire Redfield; One of Alice's former allies, who leads the surviving convoy of survivors in Nevada desert which is heading with the remaining survivors to a safe haven known as "Arcadia" in Alaska, but later used as a trap, luring the survivors as Umbrella test subjects. She is also the younger sister of Chris.
 Wentworth Miller as Chris Redfield; United States military elite soldier and the older brother of Claire, who also joins Alice and Claire in Arcadia, to battle against the infected.
 Shawn Roberts as Albert Wesker; the Chairman of the Umbrella Corporation who possesses superhuman strength, speed, and regenerative capabilities, similarly to Alice. He is one of her deadliest enemies.
 Boris Kodjoe as Luther West; a former professional basketball player who leads the band of the survivors of Los Angeles.
 Kim Coates as Bennett Sinclair; a former film producer and one of the survivors of Los Angeles.
 Sergio Peris-Mencheta as Angel Ortiz, a survivor in Los Angeles.
 Kacey Barnfield as Crystal Waters; a junior champion in swimming in her high school days, she came to Los Angeles to work as an actress and is one of the survivors.
 Norman Yeung as Kim Yong; Bennett's former intern before the virus outbreak and also one of the survivors.
 Spencer Locke as K-Mart; a young girl named after the department store where she was discovered hiding, and a member of Claire's convoy of survivors in the previous film.
 Mika Nakashima as J-Pop Girl; Japan's patient zero, first infected person there.
 Ray Olubowale as the Axeman; a monster taken from the game Resident Evil 5 (known as The Executioner).
 Sienna Guillory as Jill Valentine; former S.T.A.R.S. member & police officer of Raccoon City who helped Alice escape after the city's destruction incident, and also has gone missing ever since. She was captured by Umbrella and brainwashed through a scarab device attached to her chest, and led the assault on Arcadia.

Production

Development

In May 2005, producers mentioned the possibility of following Extinction with a sequel entitled Afterlife, to be shot and set in Tokyo, Japan and Alaska. Despite Resident Evil: Extinction being billed on the official website and elsewhere as the final installment of the Resident Evil film series; on September 23, 2007, Rory Bruer, Sony's head of distribution explained, "It absolutely would not surprise me considering the success of the franchise that they find a way to come up with another. It's a real possibility." Producer Jeremy Bolt also stated that while there was no intention of making a fourth film, that the third had been particularly well done and that Paul Anderson was talking with Sony about the possibility.  In June 2008, Anderson noted that negotiations were underway with Sony for creating the film. In December 2008, Anderson stated that he was working on the script. The following year, it was announced that Sony was aiming to release Resident Evil: Afterlife by August 27, 2010.

Casting

In September 2006, reports indicated that casting for the fourth film had begun, with Jensen Ackles being considered for the role of Leon S. Kennedy.  Ali Larter missed seven episodes of filming the television show Heroes in order to appear in the film. Before Wentworth Miller was cast as Chris Redfield, actor Johnny Messner auditioned for the role. Having never played the Resident Evil video games, Miller began preparing for the role by searching the internet for images of Chris Redfield. Much to his surprise, he noticed how muscular the character was; with only three weeks to prep before shooting, he knew it was impossible to increase his muscle mass to that extent. He was shown video footage of the games and saw how he was visually different, especially in the first game. He did cardio to build up endurance.  Miller described his interpretation on the character from the video game as: "He's definitely capable and heroic, but there's also something quite innocent. He was still freshly scrubbed, in a way, at the beginning of this horrifying journey." He described his take as the character in the film: "My Chris has been walking down this particular road for quite some time. The edges are sharper, and they're way more jagged."

Shawn Roberts was originally going to audition for Chris Redfield before Miller accepted the role. He went to audition for the role of Albert Wesker, a role previously played by Jason O'Mara. Describing the character Roberts said: "[He's the] Chairman of the Umbrella Corporation. He is in a position of power. He pretty much runs the world, and Alice is an annoyance. It's a whole process: I get to set and wardrobe gives me this big, long black jacket, and props comes over and gives me the dark glasses and the gloves. By the time you are all dressed you stand a little straighter, you walk a little differently. He's got everything going for him—he's super fast, super strong, has the ability to regenerate—it's all the elements from the game. That was one thing we all agreed on from the start: this character has to be for the fans." Sienna Guillory reprises her role as Jill Valentine, who was last seen in Resident Evil: Apocalypse. She is featured briefly in a scene shown during the credits, setting up the sequel.

Cinematography and set design
Anderson was shown footage of James Cameron's Avatar, which sold him on the idea to shoot Resident Evil: Afterlife in digital 3D. He shot in high-definition with an aspect ratio of 2.35:1, using Cameron's Fusion Camera System, or more specifically a Sony F35 camera. The crew spent two weeks in pre-production learning the 3D camera system. With a budget of about $60 million, principal photography took place for 55 days, from September 29 to December 2009. Filming in 3D added 20% to the budget. Roberts began filming his scenes on October 10, 2009. The final showdown scene was filmed for about six days. During production, Jovovich accidentally shot out a $100,000 camera.

For slow motion scenes with bullets and drops of water, twin Phantom high-speed cameras were used which filmed 200 frames per second. A fight scene with Wesker and Chris in the Resident Evil 5 game was recreated shot-by-shot for the film, and the Phantom cameras were used to create Wesker's superhuman speed which took about two days to film. The added size and weight of the 3D cameras meant the filmmakers were not able to use existing equipment such as Steadicam rigs. Instead, the camera operator worked on a Segway to achieve the look of a Steadicam shot. Much of the action scenes were shot in front of a green screen. A 1983 Yak-52 was used throughout the film by Jovovich and Larter. Stunt pilot Martin Mattes was dressed like Jovovich and flew the plane for the camera.

The 3D cameras were unable to pick up anything shiny, such as stainless steel, due to a flare. Set decorator Cal Loucks said that most items that looked metal were actually painted silver with special paint to remove its reflective quality. The saturation of colors also had to be changed to accustom the 3D cameras, which are "slow to pick up information". Loucks said: "It's a very restrictive color palette. For example, in this warehouse scene, we saturated the floors in a dark, dark charcoal, and we thought that was enough, but then the cameras showed them as still being too light. So we had to add more and more black. The reason I say it's too light is because we are putting more light onto these sets than we ever have before."

Filming locations
Principal photography was done mostly at Cinespace Film Studios in Toronto, Ontario. Toronto police received hundreds of calls from concerned neighbors after a scene involving a burning plane crashed.  For the underwater scenes, cargo shipping containers were cut and welded to make a giant tank on stage. The opening scene was filmed at Cinespace Film Studios. Interior scenes of Umbrella Corporation's subterranean lair were filmed at the Leslie Dan Faculty of Pharmacy. Robarts Library was used to portray exterior shots of a Los Angeles prison, due to its resemblance to a prison, and other scenes were shot at University of Toronto Scarborough. Scenes portraying an Alaskan aircraft boneyard were filmed at Oshawa Airport. A location depicting an Alaskan beach was filmed at Sandbanks Provincial Park. Second unit was sent to Alaska to capture establishing shots of the scenery.

Visual and special effects
Visual effects were done by Rocket Science VFX and Mr. X Inc. Paul Jones served as the special effects creator, who previously designed the Nemesis character in Resident Evil: Apocalypse. The production team planned to use extras to portray 300 zombies at once, but time restraints prevented that. Around 150 zombies were eventually used, and Mr. X Inc's visual effects supervisor, Dennis Berardi, added more in post-production. For Alice's clones, they shot motion control photography for multiple passes of Jovovich. For the wide shots, they took digital photo doubles. Visual effects production manager Eric Robertson described the look of the film: "interesting contrasts, pure whites, which is a staggering look. It's so clean and tight along with some real darkness too that may evoke a bit of a feel of Silent Hill. So we've got the extremes, but it's definitely a unique look for this incarnation and it's been fun to see those looks." A burned cityscape with ash and smoke in the sky was created to depict a postapocalyptic Los Angeles, in which most of the film is set. Bolt described this approach as: "In a world that has gone to hell in a handbasket, there's no control and no fire service, so clearly, what's going to happen to LA is it's going to get burned."

The infected Dobermans from the games and previous films return, but are more advanced. The dogs wore a costume with prosthetics.  Anderson wanted to make the dogs in this film look "absolutely terrible". Computer effects were used to make the dog's jaw flare open, with tentacles coming out of their mouths, similar to the dogs from the fourth and fifth video games. Other creatures borrowed from the fifth video game are the "Majini", who are more intelligent and have mandibles and tentacles coming out of their mouths, and "The Executioner" (named the Axeman in the film).

Release

In August 2009, it was announced that the film would be released on August 27, 2010, but that December it was set back to January 14, 2011. In January 2010, it was announced that the release date was moved to September 10, 2010. Screen Gems paid Constantin Film, Davis Films and Impact Pictures $52 million for the rights to distribute the film in North American and "most key foreign markets".

On April 3, 2010, Anderson, Jovovich and Larter attended WonderCon for a Resident Evil: Afterlife, panel answering fan questions.  On July 24, 2010, they attended the San Diego Comic-Con International to promote the film.

Soundtrack

In addition to the original soundtrack, "The Outsider" (Apocalypse Remix) by alternative rock group A Perfect Circle was used for the marketing of the film, along with a short segment of it being played during the confrontation between Alice and Wesker, as well as playing over the end credits.

Home media
Special features on the DVD includes a filmmaker commentary and two featurettes. The Blu-ray releases includes the same and also with deleted and extended scenes, additional featurettes and outtakes. An Ultra HD Blu-ray edition was released on January 17, 2017.

In 2013, Sony Pictures Home Entertainment released a two-disc set containing the first four films in the series. It was called The 4 Movie Resident Evil Collection.

Box office

United States and Canada
Resident Evil: Afterlife opened on approximately 4,700 screens in 3,203 locations, with 2,062 of the locations showing on 3D-equipped screens and 141 in IMAX 3D, ranking as one of the largest 3D releases at the time. In Canada, the film opened in an additional 250 theaters through Alliance Films. The film opened at number one and took in $10.7 million on its opening day and $26.6 million on its opening weekend. By its second weekend, the film had dropped to fourth place, with the newly-released The Town taking its first place spot. It grossed $10 million, a 63% decrease in ticket sales from its opening weekend. It fell to seventh place by its third weekend, grossing $4.9 million and was removed from 567 theaters. On its fourth weekend, Resident Evil: Afterlife moved to eleventh place, with the newly-released Case 39 at number one, while grossing $2.7 million and being dropped from 735 theaters. For the film's fifth weekend, it made $1.2 million, a 54% decrease from the previous weekend, and was removed from an additional 895 theaters. For its sixth, seventh and eight weekends, it had dropped to $347,264, $137,502 and $70,474 respectively, and was playing in 140 theaters by its eight and final weekend.

Other countries
On September 15, Resident Evil: Afterlife opened in 30 countries, bumping Inception from first place and grossing $42.3 million from 3,559 screens with 3D screenings accounting for 81% of total earnings, thereby becoming the most successful overseas debut of the entire series. More than one-third of the total came from a $15.5 million three-day launch in Japan. Additionally, the film grossed $6.4 million in Russia, $3.3 million in Spain, $2.95 million in Taiwan and $2.6 million in the UK. By September 19, it had passed Resident Evil: Extinction $97.1 million overseas total. The following day, it had surpassed Extinction total of $103.2 million overseas, 148.8 million worldwide, to become the highest-grossing entry of the series.

During its second week, the film grossed $40 million, with $5.3 million of it in Germany, $3.2 million in Mexico, $3.1 million in South Korea and $2.9 million in Brazil. Japanese ticket sales grossed $5.1 million, with Russia adding another $4.2 million. By its third weekend, it was still at number one, grossing $24.3 million, with an opening in France adding $3.5 million. Hong Kong added another $768,324. The film remained at #1 for its fourth weekend, grossing $15.6 million. On its fifth weekend, it grossed $8 million, dropping to fifth place, being replaced by Eat Pray Love at number one. By its eleventh weekend, ticket sales had dropped to $9.1 million gross, with a full $9 million of that coming from its opening in China. Overall, Resident Evil: Afterlife only missed by about $1.5 million the total the three previous films in the series had made combined.

Worldwide overview
The film grossed $60 million in the US and Canada with $240 million in other markets, for a worldwide total of $300 million. In the United States, the high box office gross was attributed to the ticket price inflation of the 3D presentation, but the film had the lowest opening weekend attendance of the film series. On November 23, 2010, Resident Evil: Afterlife became the most successful production in Canadian feature film history, as well as the highest grossing zombie film. It is also the highest-grossing film to be released by Screen Gems. Worldwide, it is the fourth highest-grossing video game film of all-time, behind Warcraft ($433.5 million), The Angry Birds Movie ($347.1 million) and Prince of Persia: The Sands of Time ($336.4 million).

Reception

Critical response

Resident Evil: Afterlife was not screened in advance for critics. The site's consensus states: "As dim-witted and lifeless as its undead antagonists, Resident Evil: Afterlife is a wholly unnecessary addition to the franchise." On Metacritic, which assigns a weighted average score out of 100 to reviews from mainstream critics, the film received an average score of 37 based on 14 reviews, indicating "generally unfavorable reviews". CinemaScore polls reported that the average grade moviegoers gave the film was a "B−" on an A+ to F scale.

Michael Ordoña of the Los Angeles Times gave it a positive review, noting the slower cut of the film and saying: "the action is easier to read than in most films of the genre, and therefore more enjoyable. Anderson makes particular use of sets and locations to wring out more bang for the stereoscopic buck". Phelim O'Neill of The Guardian gave the film two stars out of five praising the use of 3D, while stating that the Resident Evil films "always look good and have well-staged action, but they don't have one iota of originality or imagination". Chicago Readers Andrea Gronvall described the plot as "nearly indiscernible", but did call the film the "sleekest so far, thanks to 3D and star Milla Jovovich's body-hugging catsuit".

Jeannette Catsoulis of The New York Times gave the film a negative review, saying: "Cannibalizing John Carpenter's Thing and much of the sci-fi-horror canon, Afterlife is more moribund than its thronging undead". David Edwards of the Daily Mirror compared it to Resident Evil: Extinction, stating that the "results are even less impressive, which is saying quite something" and "only fans of the series will care with the film looking suspiciously like a series of barely connected action scenes and unimpressive 3D welded to a who-the-hell-cares? plot". Spill.com critics Korey Coleman and Co-Host 3000 gave the film a "Some Ol' Bullshit", the second lowest rating on the site. They criticized the overuse of slow motion, lack of explanation of certain plot elements and long lapses in between action, but gave the film points for its cinematography, small bits of action, 3D and the special effects of the Axeman. Andrew Barker of Variety compared the film to the previous installment as "equally moribund, and perhaps even more shamelessly derivative". He compared Roberts' Wesker to Hugo Weaving's Agent Smith from The Matrix, calling it a "slipshod impression". A particularly scathing review came from Brian Orndorf of Dark Horizons, who commented: "Perhaps the first 3D motion picture to simulate the experience of watching paint dry, Resident Evil: Afterlife is a dreadful bore that only occasionally comes to life."

Accolades

See also
 List of films based on video games

References

Further reading

External links

 
 
 
 

2010 films
2010 3D films
IMAX films
2010 action thriller films
2010 horror films
2010s science fiction horror films
Apocalyptic films
Films about cloning
French action thriller films
French action horror films
German action thriller films
German post-apocalyptic films
French post-apocalyptic films
German action horror films
2010s English-language films
English-language Canadian films
English-language French films
English-language German films
Films directed by Paul W. S. Anderson
Films set in Alaska
Films set in Los Angeles
Films set in Tokyo
Films set on ships
Films shot in Tokyo
Films shot in Toronto
Films scored by Tomandandy
Girls with guns films
Canadian science fiction action films
Canadian post-apocalyptic films
German science fiction action films
Afterlife
Screen Gems films
Films with screenplays by Paul W. S. Anderson
Constantin Film films
German sequel films
Films about viral outbreaks
Films produced by Don Carmody
2010s Canadian films
2010s French films
2010s German films